Saunderton railway station is a railway station on the A4010 road between High Wycombe and Princes Risborough, in Buckinghamshire, England.

The hamlet immediately around the station is also known locally as Saunderton and is indicated as such on nearby road signs, but it is not named on maps.

History

The station was opened on 1 July 1901.

In March 1913 Suffragettes attacked Saunderton station, burning down the main building. Placards reading "Votes for Women" and "Burning to get the Vote" were left on the platform. They may have chosen Saunderton Station because it is near Benjamin Disraeli's birthplace at Bradenham Manor.

The station was transferred from the Western Region of British Rail to the London Midland Region on 24 March 1974.

Services
All services are provided by Chiltern Railways. The typical Monday - Friday off-peak service consists of:

1 train per hour to 
 1 train per hour to

Facilities

The station is unstaffed. There is a (card only) ticket vending machine on the "down" (northbound) platform.

There is an Edwardian waiting room on the "up" (southbound) platform. It contains local information boards and is usually unlocked and locked by local residents for the weekday morning peak-time train services.

Notes

References

External links

Former Great Western and Great Central Joint Railway stations
Railway stations in Buckinghamshire
DfT Category F2 stations
Railway stations in Great Britain opened in 1901
Railway stations served by Chiltern Railways
1901 establishments in England